Museum of Classical Archaeology may be:

 Museum of Classical Archaeology, Adelaide, Australia
 Museum of Classical Archaeology, Cambridge, England

See also
 Ure Museum of Greek Archaeology, Reading, England